Dimboola railway station is located on the Western standard gauge line in Victoria, Australia. It serves the town of Dimboola, and it opened on 1 July 1882.

Boom barriers replaced hand-operated gates at the High Street level crossing, located nearby in the Up direction of the station, in 1980.

Much of the station was extensively altered in the 1980s, following the introduction of CTC between Ararat and Serviceton. In 1983, a signal panel was provided at the station. It was abolished in 2010.

A turntable, which was originally from Murtoa, was provided in 1988.

The station was the terminus for V/Line services from Spencer Street in Melbourne, until these services were withdrawn on 21 August 1993.

Platforms and services

Dimboola has one platform. It is serviced by Journey Beyond The Overland services.

Platform 1:
 services to Adelaide Parklands and Melbourne Southern Cross

References

External links
Victorian Railway Stations gallery

Regional railway stations in Victoria (Australia)